Vilovo may refer to:
Vilovo, Russia, a rural locality (a village) in Tver Oblast, Russia
Vilovo, Serbia, a village in the Autonomous Province of Vojvodina, Serbia